Date with Disaster is a 1957 British crime film directed by Charles Saunders and starring Tom Drake, William Hartnell and Shirley Eaton. It was made at Southall Studios in London. Location shooting took place around Southall and Chiswick. The film's sets were designed by the art director Herbert Smith.

Cast
 Tom Drake as Miles
 William Hartnell as Tracey
 Shirley Eaton as Sue
 Maurice Kaufmann as Don
 Michael Golden as Inspector Matthews
 Richard Shaw as Ken
 Charles Brodie as Charlie
 Deidre Mayne as Judy
 Peter Fontaine as Sergeant Brace
 Robert Robinson as Young Man
 John Drake as Constable Wilson
 Robert J. Mooney as Sergeant
 Van Boolen as Night Watchman

References

External links
 

1957 films
1957 crime films
Films directed by Charles Saunders
Films shot at Southall Studios
British crime films
1950s English-language films
1950s British films